The 2021 Campeonato Alagoano (officially the Campeonato Alagoano Smile 2021 for sponsorship reasons) was the 91st edition of the top football league in Alagoas. It began on 20 February and ended on 22 May 2021. 

The finals were played behind closed doors between CSA and CRB at the Estádio Rei Pelé in Maceió on 15 and 22 May 2021. Tied 1–1 on aggregate, CSA won on penalties securing their 40th title.

First phase
The top four teams advanced to the semi-finals while the bottom two teams were relegated to Campeonato Alagoano Sub 23–Segunda Divisão 2022.

Knockout phase

Semi-finals

|}

CRB qualified for 2022 Copa do Brasil

CSA qualified for 2022 Copa do Brasil

3rd place final

Finals

CSA qualified for 2022 Copa do Nordeste

2022 Copa do Brasil play-off
2021 Campeonato Alagoano third place CSE and 2021 Copa Alagoas champions ASA played a two-legged play-off to determine the third team qualified for the 2022 Copa do Brasil. If tied on aggregate, the penalty shoot-out would be used to determine the winners.

Matches

ASA qualified for 2022 Copa do Brasil

General table

Top goalscorers

References

2021 in Brazilian football leagues
Campeonato Alagoano